Tumco Wash is a wash in the Cargo Muchacho Mountains of Imperial County, California.

References

Coyote Wash (California)
Geography of the Colorado Desert
Rivers of Southern California